Erbağı is a village in the Arıcak District of Elazığ Province in Turkey. Its population is 332 (2021). The village is populated by Kurds.

References

Villages in Arıcak District
Kurdish settlements in Elazığ Province